Louis Edward Bluhm (March 22, 1940 – April 5, 1990) was an American bridge player. He played bridge professionally and was an expert at both poker and gin rummy, according to the American Contract Bridge League (ACBL).

Bluhm, an accountant, was born in Muskegon Heights, Michigan, but lived in Atlanta, Georgia for 25 years. He attended Valparaiso University. He  served in the United States Air Force during the Vietnam War and was stationed at Myrtle Beach Air Force Base, South Carolina.

He died at Williamson Medical Center in Franklin, Tennessee in 1990, at age 50.

Bluhm was inducted into the ACBL Hall of Fame in 2000. The ACBL Distinguished Player Award had been "originated for him".

Bridge accomplishments

Honors
ACBL Hall of Fame, 2000

Wins
North American Bridge Championships (9)
Silodor Open Pairs (1) 1984 
Blue Ribbon Pairs (1) 1977 
Nail Life Master Open Pairs (1) 1987 
Vanderbilt (2) 1979, 1989 
Mitchell Board-a-Match Teams (1) 1977 
Reisinger (1) 1972 
Spingold (2) 1974, 1977

Runners-up
North American Bridge Championships
Grand National Teams (1) 1983 
Vanderbilt (2) 1978, 1986 
Mitchell Board-a-Match Teams (3) 1973, 1983, 1987 
Spingold (1) 1988

References

External links
 archived

Louis E. Bluhm gravesite

1940 births
1990 deaths
American contract bridge players
People from Atlanta
People from  Muskegon Heights, Michigan
Valparaiso University alumni
United States Air Force airmen